Stašov may refer to places in the Czech Republic:

Stašov (Beroun District), a municipality and village in the Central Bohemian Region
Stašov (Svitavy District), a municipality and village in the Pardubice Region

See also
Stasov